Sandaig Bay is a coastal embayment, on a chord of , on a 194° orientation, located on the northwestern end of the sea loch, Loch Nevis, facing the Sound of Sleat. The bay is within the western end of the Knoydart peninsula, in the Lochaber district in the historical county of Inverness-shire on the north west coast of Scotland.

Geography

Directly south of Sandaig Bay is the sea Loch Hourn that separates the peninsulae of Kintail to the north and Knoydart to the south.

Sandaig Bay is known by the blown sand that has accumulated at its head. At the head of the Bay in the north corner, is the former Roman Catholic chapel. At the east side of the bay lies several rocky islands, some two cable lengths from shore i.e. lying at the entrance to the bay. The larger islands are called Eilean Mòr, Fraoch Eilean and the smaller Sgeir nan Eun. The islands and together with western exposure, make it an unsafe anchorage.

References

External link
 
 Sandaig Bay
 Walks at Sandaig Bay

Bays of Lochaber